Jean-Pierre Lehman (10 August 1914 – 26 February 1981) was a French paleontologist who specialized on tetrapods, particularly the actinopterygians. He followed early ideas comparative anatomy to study evolution through cladistic ideas and making use of biogeographical affinities.

Lehman was born in Caen to Madeleine Auvray and civil engineer Gaston Lehman. Educated at Lycée Carnot, and the Sorbonne he also went to Grenoble where he met and married Ingegärd Eneström, daughter of Swedish physician Erik Hjalmar Eneström. Visits to Sweden brought him into contact with Erik Stensiö at the Museum of Natural History of Stockholm where he worked on the vertebrates of the Upper Devonian of Scania in 1936–37. His thesis on the scales of thelodonts and acanthodians was criticized and led to a restudy of the material by J.M.J. Vergoossen. He worked as a high school teacher in Nice from 1940 to 1945 and made visits to Stockholm between 1945 and 1949. In 1950 he moved to the geology laboratory of the faculty of science in Paris and became a professor in 1956. In 1969 he went on a collection trip to Spitzbergen. He also examined fossil fish from Africa and Madagascar. He was a follower of Stensiö's ideas in cladistics and defended them. His students worked on paleoanatomy and built up the institut de paléontologie. He edited Les annales de paléontologie and was elected fellow of the French academy of sciences in 1979.

References

External links 
 Brief biography (in French) with portrait

1914 births
1981 deaths
Scientists from Caen
French paleontologists